Vincent Marchetti (born 4 July 1997) is a French professional footballer who plays as a midfielder for  club AC Ajaccio.

Career
A product of Gazélec Ajaccio's and AC Ajaccio's youth systems, he made his senior debut with AC Ajaccio on 31 July 2015, coming on as a substitute for Riad Nouri in the 0–0 draw with Dijon at the Stade François Coty.

On 16 July 2016, Marchetti signed for Ligue 1 club Nancy due to AC Ajaccio having to sell him to escape relegation from the Direction Nationale du Contrôle de Gestion (DNCG).

Career statistics

References

External links
 Vincent Marchetti at foot-national.com
 
 
 
 

1997 births
Living people
French footballers
Footballers from Corsica
Sportspeople from Ajaccio
France youth international footballers
Association football defenders
Gazélec Ajaccio players
AC Ajaccio players
AS Nancy Lorraine players
Ligue 1 players
Ligue 2 players
Championnat National 3 players
French people of Italian descent